Romain may refer to:

People

Given name
 Romain Bussine (1830–1899), French poet and voice professor
 Romain Rolland (1866–1944), French writer
 Romain de Tirtoff (1892–1990), French artist and designer known as Erté
 Romain Bellenger (1894–1981), French road racing cyclist
 Romain Gijssels (1907–1978), Belgian professional road bicycle racer
 Romain Maes (1912–1983), Belgian cyclist
 Romain Gary (1914–1980), French novelist, film director, World War II pilot, and diplomat
 Romain Weingarten (1926–2006), French playwright
 Romain Duris (born 1974), French actor
 Romain Sardou (born 1974), successful French novelist
 Romain Barnier (born 1976), freestyle swimmer
 Romain Ferrier (born 1976), French defender
 Romain Larrieu (born 1976), goalkeeper
 Romain Haguenauer (born 1976), French ice dancing coach, choreographer, and former competitor
 Romain Dumas (born 1977), French racing driver
 Romain Pitau (born 1977), French football midfielder
 Romain Barras (born 1980), French decathlete
 Romain Sato (born 1981), Central African basketball player
 Romain Jacuzzi (born 1984), French midfielder
 Romain Feillu (born 1984), French road racing cyclist 
 Romain Villa (born 1985), French Cyclist
 Romain Vincelot (born 1985), French defender
 Romain Jouan (born 1985), French professional tennis player
 Romain Danzé (born 1986), French football player
 Romain Grosjean (born 1986), Formula One driver
 Romain Brégerie (born 1986), French footballer
 Romain Gasmi (born 1987), French footballer
 Romain Genevois (born 1987), Haitian footballer
 Romain Hamouma (born 1987), French footballer
 Romain Hardy (born 1988), professional cyclist
 Romain Virgo (born 1990), Jamaican singer
 Romain Bardet (born 1990), French road racing cyclist
 Romain Arneodo (born 1992), French-born Monegasque tennis player
 Romain Gall (born 1995), American soccer player 
 Romain Le Gac (born 1995), French ice dancer
 Romain Del Castillo (born 1996), French footballer
 Romain Ntamack (born 1999), French rugby player

Surname
 Jonathan Romain (born 1954), English writer, broadcaster and rabbi
 Jérôme Romain (born 1971), French track and field athlete
 James Romain (born 1987), American football defensive back

Places
 Romain, Doubs, a commune in the department of Doubs, France
 Romain, Jura, a commune in the department of Jura, France
 Romain, Marne, a commune in the department of Marne, France
 Romain, Meurthe-et-Moselle, a commune in the department of Meurthe-et-Moselle, France

Other uses
 Romain, an alternate name for César (grape), a red wine grape from Burgundy

See also
 Le Romain (disambiguation)
 Romaine (disambiguation)

French masculine given names